Oring may refer to:
O-ring, a gasket or seal with an O-shaped cross-section
O-ring chain, a specialized type of roller chain
Oring language, in Nigeria
Orienteering
Fox Oring
OR-ing as an operation of logical disjunction, in logic, electronics, or computer science
Ring of O, the BDSM jewelry
O-Ring theory of economic development
O-Ring failure as a cause of the Space Shuttle Challenger disaster
O ring (smoke), trick while exhaling smoke